In the area of modern algebra known as group theory, the Thompson group Th is a sporadic simple group of order
   2153105372131931
 = 90745943887872000
 ≈ 9.

History
They constructed it as the automorphism group of a certain lattice in the 248-dimensional Lie algebra of E8. It does not preserve the Lie bracket of this lattice, but does preserve the Lie bracket mod 3, so is a subgroup of the Chevalley group E8(3). The subgroup preserving the Lie bracket (over the integers) is a maximal subgroup of the Thompson group called the  Dempwolff group (which unlike the Thompson group is a subgroup of the compact Lie group E8).

Representations

The centralizer of an element of order 3 of type 3C in the Monster group is a product of the Thompson group and a group of order 3, as a result of which the Thompson group acts on a vertex operator algebra over the field with 3 elements. This vertex operator algebra contains the E8 Lie algebra over F3, giving the embedding of Th into E8(3).

The Schur multiplier and the outer automorphism group of the Thompson group are both trivial.

Generalized monstrous moonshine

Conway and Norton suggested in their 1979 paper that monstrous moonshine is not limited to the monster, but that similar phenomena may be found for other groups. Larissa Queen and others subsequently found that one can construct the expansions of many Hauptmoduln from simple combinations of dimensions of sporadic groups. 

and j(τ) is the j-invariant.

Maximal subgroups 
 found the 16 conjugacy classes of maximal subgroups of Th as follows:

 2+1+8 · A9
 25 · L5(2)  This is the Dempwolff group
 (3 x G2(3)) : 2
 (33 × 3+1+2) · 3+1+2 : 2S4
 32 · 37 : 2S4
 (3 × 34 : 2 · A6) : 2
 5+1+2 : 4S4
 52 : GL2(5)
 72 : (3 × 2S4)
 31 : 15
3D4(2) : 3
 U3(8) : 6
 L2(19)
 L3(3)
 M10
 S5

References

External links 
 MathWorld: Thompson group
 Atlas of Finite Group Representations: Thompson group

Sporadic groups